Newson is an English surname and given name. Notable people with the name include:

People

Surname
Bob Newson (1910–1988), South African cricketer
George Newson (born 1932), English avant garde composer
Henry Winston Newson (1909–1978), American physicist
Jared Newson (born 1984), American basketball player
Linda Newson, academic
Lloyd Newson (born 1957), director, dancer and choreographer
Kendall Newson (born 1980), American football player
Marc Newson (born 1963), Australian industrial designer
Mark Newson (born 1960), English footballer
Mary Frances Winston Newson (1869–1959), American mathematician
Moses Newson (born 1927), American journalist
Percy Newson (1874–1950), English banker
Thomas Newson (born 1994), Dutch DJ and record producer
Warren Newson (born 1964), American baseball player
Zoe Newson (born 1992), British powerlifter

Given name
Newson Garrett (1812–1893), English brewer

Fictional characters 
 Richard Newson, a character in Hardy's novel The Mayor of Casterbridge

See also 
 Newsom, another name